Xavier Cooks (born 19 August 1995) is an Australian professional basketball player for the Washington Wizards of the National Basketball Association (NBA). He played college basketball for the Winthrop Eagles, where he was named the 2018 Big South Conference Player of the Year. In 2022, he helped the Sydney Kings win the NBL championship while earning Grand Final MVP honours. In 2023, he was named NBL MVP and won his second straight NBL championship.

Early life
Cooks was born in Ballarat, Victoria. He grew up in Wollongong, New South Wales, and attended Holy Spirit College.

In 2013, Cooks played for the Illawarra Hawks in the Waratah League. The following year, he moved to Canberra and played for the BA Centre of Excellence in the South East Australian Basketball League (SEABL).

College career
Cooks moved to the United States in 2014 to play college basketball for the Winthrop Eagles. He chose Winthrop over offers from schools such as UC Santa Barbara, Boise State, Hartford, Maine, and Nicholls State.

As a freshman in 2014–15, Cooks was named to the Big South Conference All-Freshman Team. As a sophomore in 2015–16, he earned second-team All-Big South honours.

As a junior in 2016–17, Cooks earned first-team All-Big South. He helped Winthrop win the Big South Tournament and earned Big South All-Tournament Team. On 15 February 2017, he recorded the first 20-point, 20-rebound game for Winthrop since 2003.

As a senior in 2017–18, Cooks was again named first-team All-Big South and the Big South Player of the Year. During the season, he became Winthrop's all-time leading rebounder.

In 2020, Cooks was voted into the Big South Men's Basketball All-Decade Team (2010–19).

Professional career

s.Oliver Würzburg (2018–2019)
After going undrafted in the 2018 NBA draft, Cooks joined the Golden State Warriors for the 2018 NBA Summer League. He played for s.Oliver Würzburg in Germany in 2018–19 and then joined the Phoenix Suns for the 2019 NBA Summer League.

Cooks initially signed with French team SIG Strasbourg for the 2019–20 season, but left due to injury.

Sydney Kings (2019–2023)
On 27 November 2019, Cooks signed with the Sydney Kings of the Australian NBL on a multi-year deal. Following the 2019–20 season, Cooks opted out of his deal and then re-signed with the Kings for the 2020–21 NBL season. He averaged 10.3 points, 5.1 rebounds, and 2.5 assists per game in his second season with Sydney.

On 30 June 2021, Cooks re-signed with the Kings for the 2021–22 NBL season. He helped the Kings win the 2022 NBL championship while earning Grand Final MVP honours.

On 18 May 2022, Cooks signed with the Wellington Saints for the rest of the 2022 New Zealand NBL season. He went on to win league MVP, All-Star Five and Most Outstanding Forward.

On 22 June 2022, Cooks re-signed with the Kings on a three-year deal. On 29 January 2023, he had 16 points, 10 rebounds and 10 assists in a 111–106 win over the South East Melbourne Phoenix, marking the league's first triple-double since 2021 and the first from a Sydney player since Dontaye Draper in 2008. He went on to win NBL MVP for the 2022–23 season and helped the Kings win back-to-back championships. He finished the season averaging 14.5 points, 7.6 rebounds and 3.6 assists per game.

Washington Wizards (2023–present)
On 17 March 2023, Cooks signed with the Washington Wizards of the National Basketball Association (NBA). He made his NBA debut the next day, recording two rebounds in five and a half minutes against the Sacramento Kings.

National team career
In 2017, Cooks was named to the Australian "Emerging Boomers" squad for the Summer Universiade.

In early August 2019, Cooks made the final cut for Australia's 2019 FIBA World Cup roster. However, one week later he was forced to withdraw from the competition due to a knee injury sustained during practice.

Personal life
Cooks is the son of Eric and Josie. His father is an African-American expatriate who became a naturalised citizen of Australia, and his mother is Australian. His father played college basketball for St. Mary's College in California before relocating to Australia to pursue a professional career. He has two siblings, Georgia and Dominique. His brother was also a basketball player.

References

External links
Winthrop Eagles bio
College stats @ sports-References.com

1995 births
Living people
Australian people of African-American descent
Australian expatriate basketball people in Germany
Australian expatriate basketball people in the United States
Australian Institute of Sport basketball players
Australian men's basketball players
Basketball players from New South Wales
National Basketball Association players from Australia
Power forwards (basketball)
s.Oliver Würzburg players
Sportspeople from Wollongong
Sydney Kings players
Undrafted National Basketball Association players
Washington Wizards players
Wellington Saints players
Winthrop Eagles men's basketball players